Gustav Reinier Uhlenbeek (born 20 August 1970) is a Dutch former footballer. He was born in Paramaribo in the former Dutch colony Suriname, but grew up in Amsterdam. Uhlenbeek spent more than a decade in English football, and was released by Halifax Town at the end of the 2006–07 season.

Career
Uhlenbeek plays on the right side of midfield, or as a right-back. He began his career at Ajax, but only played twice for the first team and left the club in 1992. He later played first division football for Cambuur Leeuwarden and TOP Oss, before joining English side Ipswich in 1995.

In his first two seasons at Portman Road, Uhlenbeek was a regular, but he lost his place in the team, and joined Fulham in 1998. After two years at Fulham and one goal against Wrexham, he joined Sheffield United in 2000. He spent two seasons at Bramall Lane, where he gained something of a cult status, before later playing for Walsall, Bradford City (scoring once against Rotherham), Chesterfield and Wycombe Wanderers. After being released by Wycombe in the summer of 2005, he joined Mansfield Town.

Uhlenbeek had a fine but somewhat inconsistent season at Mansfield, where he was one of the few veterans in an otherwise very young team. His contract expired at the end of the 2005–06 season, and Uhlenbeek was subsequently released. After his release he joined Halifax Town, where he spent a year.

References

External links

1970 births
Living people
Sportspeople from Paramaribo
Footballers from Amsterdam
Dutch footballers
Dutch expatriate footballers
Eredivisie players
Eerste Divisie players
English Football League players
AFC Ajax players
TOP Oss players
SC Cambuur players
Ipswich Town F.C. players
Fulham F.C. players
Sheffield United F.C. players
Bradford City A.F.C. players
Walsall F.C. players
Chesterfield F.C. players
Wycombe Wanderers F.C. players
Mansfield Town F.C. players
Halifax Town A.F.C. players
AFC Ajax (amateurs) players
Expatriate footballers in England
Surinamese emigrants to the Netherlands
Association football defenders